Caspian pipeline may refer to:

 Caspian Pipeline Consortium, an oil pipeline from Kazakhstan to Russia
 Trans-Caspian Gas Pipeline, a planned natural gas pipeline from Turkmenistan to Azerbaijan
 Trans-Caspian Oil Pipeline, a proposed oil pipeline from Kazakhstan to Azerbaijan
 Pre Caspian Pipeline, North Caspian pipeline or Caspian Littoral Gas Pipeline, a planned amendment to the Central Asia–Center gas pipeline system
 Baku–Tbilisi–Ceyhan pipeline, an oil pipeline from Azerbaijan to Turkey